Twelve Angry Months is a concept album by the alternative rock band Local H. It was released on May 13, 2008 on Shout! Factory. The album is about experiences surrounding a relationship breakup, with each track corresponding to a month in the year after the break-up.  The title is an allusion to Twelve Angry Men.  The first single is "24 Hour Break-Up Session".
The album was scheduled for a UK release on 18 August 2008, however this was delayed for unknown reasons until 25 August 2008.
The song 'Blur' is a revised version of a song that appears on the band's EP The '92 Demos.

Track listing

Personnel
Scott Lucas – guitar, vocals, bass, synthesizer, organ
Brian St. Clair – drums

Production
Andy Gerber
Brian Leach
Scott Lucas
Geoff Sabin
Blaise Barton
Mike Willison
Micah Wilshire (mixing)
Michael Chalecki (mastering)

References

External links
Album Preview

Local H albums
2008 albums
Shout! Factory albums